Lac des Confins is located just below the station of La Clusaz in the Haute-Savoie department in the Rhône-Alpes region in south-eastern France.  The lake is situated at the foot of the Aravis Range. Nearby is the Pointe Percée.

Every year, at the end of the skiing season, there is a light-hearted descent.  The skiers run down the hills towards the lake as fast as they can, the idea being to see who can jump the furthest into the lake.  All participants are encouraged. 

Confins